The Turtle River is a  tributary of the Red River of the North in northeastern North Dakota in the United States. It flows for almost its entire length in Grand Forks County. Via the Red River, Lake Winnipeg and the Nelson River, the Turtle River is part of the watershed of Hudson Bay.

Course
The Turtle rises as two streams, the North Branch, which begins as an intermittent stream in eastern Nelson County, and the South Branch; the two converge near the town of Larimore. The river flows generally eastward in a highly meandering course through Turtle River State Park and past the Grand Forks Air Force Base; it turns northward as it nears the Red River and flows through the town of Manvel before entering the Red just upstream of Oslo, Minnesota.

See also
List of North Dakota rivers
List of tributaries of Hudson Bay

References

External links

Turtle River State Park website

Bodies of water of Grand Forks County, North Dakota
Rivers of North Dakota
Tributaries of the Red River of the North